The flag of the Faroe Islands (in Faroese: Merkið) is an offset cross, representing Christianity. It is similar in design to other Nordic flags – a tradition set by the Dannebrog of Denmark, of which the Faroe Islands are an autonomous territory.

The flag is called Merkið, which means "the banner" or "the mark". It resembles the flags of neighbouring Norway and Iceland.

Description and symbolism
The design of the flag incorporates a red Nordic cross, which is offset to the left. The red cross is fimbriated azure and is set on a white field. The flag design closely resembles that of the Norwegian flag, with the fimbriated cross.

White symbolises the creators of the flag, the foam of the sea and the pure, radiant sky of the Faroe Islands, while the old Faroese blue and red colours are reminiscent of other Scandinavian and Nordic flags, representing the Faroe Islands' bonds with other Nordic countries.

Colours
The specific colours of the flag are defined in a 1959 law.

History
The modern Faroese flag was devised in 1919 by Jens Oliver Lisberg and others while they were studying in Copenhagen. The first time Merkið was raised in the Faroe Islands was on 22 June that year in Fámjin on the occasion of a wedding. On 25 April 1940, the British occupation government approved the flag for use by Faroese vessels, during the tenure of Carl Aage Hilbert as Danish prefect. Britain did not want the same flag as German-occupied Denmark to be used. April 25 is still celebrated as Flaggdagur and it is a national holiday. With the Home Rule Act of 23 March, 1948, the flag was recognized by the Danish Government as the national flag of the Faroes. The original flag is displayed in the church of Fámjin in Suðuroy.

See also

Flag of Denmark
Flag of Greenland
List of flags of Denmark
Nordic Cross flag
Raven banner

Notes

References 
 
 Learn about the Flag of Faroe islands on Faroeisland.fo

1940 establishments in the Faroe Islands
Faroe Islands
National symbols of the Faroe Islands
Faroe Islands
 
Faroe Islands
Faroe Islands
Faroe